Sailor is a surname. Notable people with the surname include:

Walter Ronnie Sailor Jr., American former State Representative and convicted money launderer
Wendell Sailor (born 1974), Australian rugby footballer

See also

English-language surnames